Westlink, West Link or West-link may refer to:

Roadways
West Link, a planned railway tunnel under central Gothenburg, Sweden
West-Link, a toll bridge on the M50 motorway outside of Dublin, Ireland
Westlink (road), a dual-carriageway throughpass in Belfast, Northern Ireland
Westlink M7, an urban freeway connecting the northern and southern suburbs of Sydney, Australia
City West Link, a link road in Sydney, Australia

Other uses
Westlink (Australian TV channel), a former government TV channel based in Western Australia
Westlink (bus company), a former London bus company bought by London United Busways in 1995
Westlink, Wichita, Kansas, a neighborhood in Wichita, Kansas, U.S.
Westlink Tower, one of the tallest buildings in Switzerland
Victa Westlink Rail, a defunct railway company based in Derby, England
Westlink, a brand name used by the airline SAS Commuter in Norway
WestLink, a satellite service operated by KNME-TV in Albuquerque, New Mexico, U.S.

See also
East-West Link (disambiguation)
Western Link (disambiguation)